KGMY (1400 AM) is a radio station broadcasting a sports format. Licensed to Springfield, Missouri, United States, it serves the Springfield market.  The station is currently owned by iHeartMedia, Inc. and licensed as iHM Licenses, LLC.

KGMY was the ESPN Radio affiliate for Springfield until January 1, 2015. On October 23, 2014, it was announced that KWTO-FM, the market's Fox Sports Radio affiliate, would assume the ESPN Radio affiliation effective January 1, 2015. Fox Sports Radio moved to KGMY on the same date.

External links

GMY
Sports radio stations in the United States
Radio stations established in 1942
IHeartMedia radio stations